San Luis de Lucma District is one of fifteen districts of the province Cutervo in Peru.

References